The 2014–15 Texas Tech Lady Raiders basketball team will represent Texas Tech University in the 2014–15 college basketball season. It will be head coach Candi Whitaker's second season at Texas Tech. The Lady Raiders, were members of the Big 12 Conference and will play their home games at the United Supermarkets Arena. They finished the season 15–16, 5–13 in Big 12 play to finish in last place. They lost in the first round of Big 12 women's tournament to West Virginia.

Rankings

Before the season

Departures

2014–15 media

Television & Radio information
Select Lady Raiders games will be shown on FSN affiliates throughout the season, including FSSW, FSSW+, and FCS Atlantic, Central, and Pacific. All games will be broadcast on the Lady Raiders Radio Network on either KLZK or KJTV.

Roster

Schedule

|-
!colspan=12 style="background:#CC0000; color:black;"| Non-Conference Regular Season

|-
!colspan=12 style="background:#CC0000; color:black;"| Big 12 Regular Season

|-
!colspan=12 style="background:#CC0000; color:black;"|  2015 Big 12 women's basketball tournament

See also
Texas Tech Lady Raiders basketball
2014–15 Texas Tech Red Raiders basketball team

References

Texas Tech
Texas Tech Lady Raiders basketball seasons